Daneels is a surname. Notable people with the surname include:

François Daneels (1921–2010), Belgian saxophonist, composer, and music educator
Lennerd Daneels (born 1998), Belgian footballer

See also
Daneel
Daniels (surname)